There have been five Wallace Baronetcies; two in the Baronetage of Nova Scotia, and three in the Baronetage of the United Kingdom. All are now extinct.

Wallace baronets, of Craigie Wallace, Ayr (1638—1659)
Created in the Baronetage of Nova Scotia.
Sir Hugh Wallace, 1st Baronet (c. 1600–1660) (resigned the baronetcy in 1659)

Wallace baronets, of Craigie, Ayr (8 March 1670—18 August 1770)
Created in the Baronetage of Nova Scotia.
Sir Thomas Wallace, 1st Baronet (died 1680)
Sir William Wallace, 2nd Baronet (died 1700)
Sir Thomas Wallace, 3rd Baronet (1665–1728)
Sir Thomas Wallace, 4th Baronet (1702–1770) extinct on his death.

Style of baronet subsequently assumed by:
Sir Thomas Dunlop Wallace (1750–1835)
Sir John Alexander Dunlop Agnew Wallace (1775–1857)

Wallace baronets, of Hertford House, London (24 November 1871—20 July 1890)
Created in the Baronetage of the United Kingdom.
Sir Richard Wallace, 1st Baronet (1818–1890) extinct on his death.

Wallace baronets, of Terreglestown, Kirkcudbright (25 January 1922—5 February 1940)
Created in the Baronetage of the United Kingdom.
Sir Matthew Gemmill Wallace, 1st Baronet (1854–1940) extinct on his death.

Wallace baronets, of Studham, Bedfordshire (8 June 1937—24 May 1944)
Created in the Baronetage of the United Kingdom.
Sir Cuthbert Sidney Wallace, 1st Baronet (1867–1944) extinct on his death.

See also 
Craigie Castle, Ayrshire – a Wallace family barony.

References

Extinct baronetcies in the Baronetage of Nova Scotia
Extinct baronetcies in the Baronetage of the United Kingdom